Blanding is a city in San Juan County, Utah, United States. The population was 3,375 at the 2010 census, making it the most populated city in San Juan County. It was settled in the late 19th century by Mormon settlers, predominantly from the famed Hole-In-The-Rock expedition.  Economic contributors include mineral processing, mining, agriculture, local commerce, tourism, and transportation.

Blanding is located near both the Navajo and White Mesa Ute Native American reservations and a significant percentage of Blanding's population has family ties to these nearby cultures.  Blanding is a gateway to an abundance of nearby natural and archaeological resources, including The Dinosaur Museum, Natural Bridges National Monument, Monument Valley, and the Four Corners area, Glen Canyon National Recreation Area (Lake Powell), Cedar Mesa archaeological and wilderness area, the San Juan River including Goosenecks State Park, and the Needles district of Canyonlands National Park.  It is located approximately 1 hour south of the popular recreation hub of Moab and Arches National Park.

History
First known as Grayson (after Nellie Grayson Lyman, wife of settler Joseph Lyman), the town changed its name in 1914 when a wealthy easterner, Thomas W. Bicknell, offered a thousand-volume library to any town that would adopt his name. Grayson competed with Thurber, Utah (renamed Bicknell) for the prize. Grayson was renamed Blanding after the maiden name of Bicknell's wife, and each town received 500 books.

On the morning of June 10, 2009, sixteen Blanding residents were arrested in more than a dozen raids performed by federal agents and indicted as part of an undercover investigation of violations of the Archeological Resources Protection Act. Eight others around the Four Corners region were also indicted. The raid was the largest undercover sting of its kind in the country. The raid was the conclusion of a two-year investigation by FBI and BLM agents code-named "Cerberus Action" in which an undercover agent was able to purchase 256 artifacts for $335,685. One indicted resident, Dr. James DeMar Redd, died by suicide on June 11. The undercover informant, Ted Gardiner, died by suicide on March 1, 2010.

Geography
Blanding is located at  (37.623199, -109.478943) in the Four Corners area of the Colorado Plateau.

According to the United States Census Bureau, the city has a total area of 2.4 square miles (6.1 km2), all land.

Demographics

As of the census of 2010, there were 3,375 people, 1,013 households, and 785 families residing in the city. The population density was 1,332.7 people per square mile (515.1/km2). There were 1,110 housing units at an average density of 417.7 per square mile (161.4/km2). The racial makeup of the city was 66.1% White, 0.3% African American, 29.4% Native American, 0.09% Asian, 0.01% Pacific Islander, .5% from other races, and 3.3% from two or more races. Hispanic or Latino of any race were 3.8% of the population.

There were 1,013 households, out of which 43.2% had children under the age of 18 living with them, 59% were married couples living together, 14.3% had a female householder with no husband present, and 22.5% were non-families. 20.4% of all households were made up of individuals, and 8.8% had someone living alone who was 65 years of age or older. The average household size was 3.19, and the average family size was 3.71.

In the city, the population was spread out, with 39.2% under the age of 19, 9.87% from 20 to 24, 22% from 25 to 44, 18.8% from 45 to 64, and 11.2% who were 65 years of age or older. The median age was 26.6 years. For every 100 females, there were 95.3 males. For every 100 females aged 18 and over, there were 88.3 males.

The median income for a household in the city was $43,946, and the median income for a family was $50,833. Males had a median income of $42,667 versus $21,615 for females. About 14.1% of families and 11.1% of the population were below the poverty line, including 34.0% of those under age 18 and 10.9% of those aged 65 or over.

Education
The San Juan School District operates Blanding Elementary School, Albert R. Lyman Middle School, and San Juan High School in Blanding.

Utah State University has a campus in Blanding.

Climate

According to the Köppen Climate Classification system, Blanding has a cold semi-arid climate, abbreviated "BSk" on climate maps.

See also

 List of cities and towns in Utah

Community
 Arizona breccia pipe uranium mineralization
 Blanding Municipal Airport
 KBDX
 Swallow's Nest (Blanding, Utah)
Geographically
 Abajo Mountains
 Bears Ears National Monument
 Colorado Plateau
 Four Corners
 Hovenweep National Monument
Roadways
 U.S. Route 191 in Utah
 Utah State Route 95
 Utah State Route 262

References

External links

 Blanding City Chamber of Commerce

Cities in Utah
Populated places established in 1905
Cities in San Juan County, Utah
1905 establishments in Utah